On the Night is the second live album by the British rock band Dire Straits, released on 10 May 1993 by Vertigo Records internationally, and by Warner Bros. Records in the United States. The album features many of the band's later hits, including the singles "Walk of Life" and "Money for Nothing".

Recording
On the Night was recorded in May 1992 at Les Arenes in Nîmes, France, and at Feijenoord Stadion in Rotterdam, The Netherlands, concerts that were part of the On Every Street Tour, which included 216 shows in Europe, North America, and Australia, and sold 7.1 million tickets.

Release
On the Night was released on 10 May 1993 by Vertigo Records internationally, and by Warner Bros. Records in the United States.
A CD single for "Your Latest Trick" entitled Encores, was released in the UK which included three additional recordings from the tour: "The Bug", "Solid Rock" and "Local Hero - Wild Theme".

The album was remastered and reissued with the rest of the Dire Straits catalogue in 1996 for most of the world outside the United States.

Critical response

In his review for AllMusic, Stephen Thomas Erlewine gave the album two out of five stars, writing that the album "works sporadically, offering enough good material to interest fans but not enough to win back the commercial audience earned by Brothers in Arms."

Track listing
All songs were written by Mark Knopfler, except where indicated.

Personnel
Dire Straits 
 Mark Knopfler – lead guitar, lead vocals
 John Illsley – bass guitar, backing vocals
 Alan Clark – piano, organ, synthesizers
 Guy Fletcher – synthesizers, backing vocals
Other musicians
 Chris White – saxophone, flute, percussion, backing vocals
 Paul Franklin – pedal steel guitar
 Phil Palmer – guitar, backing vocals
 Danny Cummings – percussion, backing vocals
 Chris Whitten – drums

Production
 Guy Fletcher – producer
 Neil Dorfsman – producer, engineer, mixing
 Mark Knopfler – producer
 Ronald Prent – assistant engineer
 Peter Brandt – assistant engineer
 Appie van Els – assistant engineer
 Andre den Besten – driver, Eurosound Mobil 4
 Bob Ludwig – mastering
 Sutton Cooper – artwork 
 Paul Cummins – artwork
 Ross Halfin – photography
 Mark Leialoha – photography
 Guido Karp – photography
 Roger Ressmeyer – photography (Science Photo Library)

Video

On the Night video was released on 11 May 1993 by Universal Music internationally, and included all of the songs from the CD plus three additional tracks: "The Bug", "Solid Rock", and "Wild Theme". "The Bug" was placed between "Romeo and Juliet" and "Private Investigations", while the other two tracks were placed at the end. The three omitted tracks were released separately on the Encores EP. The concert film was released in a PAL-format DVD in the United Kingdom, VideoCD in the Netherlands, and a region-free NTSC DVD importable from Canada on 23 November 2004.

Track listing
All songs were written by Mark Knopfler, except where indicated.

Personnel
Music
 Mark Knopfler – lead guitar, lead vocals
 John Illsley – bass guitar, backing vocals
 Alan Clark – piano, organ, synthesizers
 Guy Fletcher – synthesizers, backing vocals
 Chris White – saxophone, flute, backing vocals
 Paul Franklin – pedal steel guitar
 Phil Palmer – guitar, backing vocals
 Danny Cummings – percussion, backing vocals
 Chris Whitten – drums

Production
 Paul Cummins – producer
 Gilly Tarrant – assistant producer
 Graham Brennan – editor
 Christine Strand – live director
 Robert Collins – live sound engineer
 Chas Herington – lighting design
 Ian Baker – video post production
 Dave Southwood – video post production

Charts

Weekly charts

Year-end charts

Certifications

References

External links
 On the Night at Mark Knopfler official website

1993 live albums
1993 video albums
Albums produced by Guy Fletcher
Albums produced by Mark Knopfler
Dire Straits live albums
Live video albums
Vertigo Records live albums
Vertigo Records video albums
Warner Records live albums
Warner Records video albums